The Colman Automotive Building is a building located at 401 E. Pine Street in Seattle, Washington. It was added to the National Register of Historic Places in 2013.

Description and history 

It was used as a car dealership and also for car repair.  In 1917 it included a dealership for Stanley Steamer cars and one for United Motors (distributors for Reo, Dart, Cole and Roamer Motor Cars, Indiana, Reo & Duplex Motor Trucks).

It was deemed notable as "one of the last surviving buildings from the early period of Seattle's Pike-Pine "Auto Row" district that has not been significantly altered."

It also served as a gas station by 1937, having a drive-through gas pump area in its northwest corner at East Pine Street and Bellevue Avenue.

See also
 National Register of Historic Places listings in Seattle, Washington

References

1916 establishments in Washington (state)
Auto dealerships on the National Register of Historic Places
Buildings designated early commercial in the National Register of Historic Places
Capitol Hill, Seattle
Commercial buildings completed in 1916
Commercial buildings on the National Register of Historic Places in Washington (state)
National Register of Historic Places in Seattle